A basic law is either a codified constitution, or in countries with uncodified constitutions, a law given to have constitution powers and effect. The term basic law is used in some places as an alternative to "constitution", implying it is a temporary but necessary measure without formal enactment of constitution. The name is generally used to imply an interim or transitory nature, or to avoid claiming to be "the highest law", often for religious reasons. In West Germany the term "Basic Law" (Grundgesetz) was used to indicate that the Basic Law was provisional until the ultimate reunification of Germany. But in 1990 no new constitution was adopted and instead the Basic Law was adopted throughout the entire German territory. Basic law is entrenched in that it overrides ordinary 'statute law' passed by the legislature.

The Special Administrative Regions of the People's Republic of China, namely Hong Kong and Macau, have basic laws as their constitutional documents. The basic laws are the highest authority, respectively, in the territories, while the rights of amendment and interpretation rest with the Standing Committee of the National People's Congress of the People's Republic of China.

List of basic laws 

 Basic Law for the Federal Republic of Germany
 Hong Kong Basic Law
 Basic Law, Fundamental Law or Constitution of Hungary
 Basic Laws of Israel
 Macao Basic Law
 Basic Statute of Oman
 Basic Law of Saudi Arabia
 Basic Laws of Sweden
 Bangsamoro Organic Law (sometimes called the Bangsamoro Basic Law)

See also 
 Constitution
 Rule according to higher law
 Fundamental Law

Constitutional law